Jonathan Painchaud (born September 17, 1974) is a Canadian singer-songwriter from Iles de la Madeleine, Quebec.

Painchaud is a former member of the group Okoumé. He released a duo album with his brother, Eloi, in 2002, and released four solo albums since then, Qu'on se lève (2007), La dernière des arcades (2010), Mon cœur collé au tien (2013) and La tête haute (2016). 

Jonathan and Eloi Painchaud have since formed the band Salebarbes, who have released the albums Live au Pas Perdus (2019) and Gin à l'eau salée (2021), and won the Félix Award for Group of the Year at the 44th Félix Awards in 2022.

Discography
Au nom du père (Éloi et Jonathan Painchaud, 2002)
Mon plus beau rêve
Parle, parle
Shalala
Ranch Flavor
Chat noir
Que du vent
Un
Petite symphonie
Le soleil se lève encore
Berceuse
Verre Bouteille
C'est fini
Louisianne

C'est la vie (2006)
C'est La Vie
Maria
Perfect Match
Comme Un Con
Orphelin
J'aime une femme
9 décembre
Trop Tard
Reste Avec Moi
Ça Me Rentre Dedans
Ma Girl À Moi
J'ai Pas Menti
Et Toi

Qu'on se lève (2007)
Les vieux chums
Qu'on se lève
Pousse, pousse
Tout simplement
Laisse toi pas détruire
Au bout des doigts
Haschich
Le goon
Pour mon grand frère
Le kid
Le méchant
Belle ballerine

La dernière des arcades (2010)
Toujours rebelle
Si t'es vivant
Seul à seul
Dans le sang et l'encre
Rien à chanter
Trou d'eau
La dernière des arcades
Bruce Lee vs Chuck Norris
Les fantômes du passé
À genoux

Mon cœur collé au tien (2013)
Fais-toi s'en pas
Pour de vrai
Edge
Menteur
Goéland
Deloréan
Celle-ci
Histoire de frère
Drôle de temps
Clutching at straws
Petite poupée

La tête haute (2016)

La tête haute
Belle infirmière
Me laisser porter par les vents
C'était tout juste l'automne
Rat Race
C'est pas tous les jours dimanche
La reine de ma maison
Plus que la vie elle-même
Le quadrupède pétomane
Pour une journée au moins

References
Footnotes

General references
Sur le divan avec Jonathan Painchaud. La Presse.
Un spectacle devant la famille et les amis pour Jonathan Painchaud!. Journal le Nord.

Living people
1974 births
21st-century Canadian male singers
Canadian rock singers
Canadian folk singers
Singers from Quebec
People from Gaspésie–Îles-de-la-Madeleine
Canadian folk rock musicians